Dillon High School is a public high school in Dillon, South Carolina, United States. It is a part of Dillon School District Four. It is the home of the Dillon Wildcats. The current schoolhouse was built in 1970, with additions in 2000. The school itself dates back to the late 1800s, with portions of 1896 and 1910 buildings still in use for other educational purposes. Timothy Gibbs serves the school as principal, and D. Ray Rogers is the superintendent of the school's district.

References

External links 

Schools in Dillon County, South Carolina
Public high schools in South Carolina
Educational institutions established in 1917
1917 establishments in South Carolina